Gethsemane Episcopal Church is an historic church in downtown Minneapolis, Minnesota, United States, listed on the National Register of Historic Places.  It is one of the oldest extant churches in Minneapolis and is significant for its Gothic Revival architecture.

Architect Edward Stebbins modeled the church on small Gothic style churches in rural England. It is proportioned rather broadly, as opposed having tall proportions, which is rather unusual for churches designed in the late 19th century. The area surrounding the church was primarily residential when it was first built, but it is now surrounded by commercial development.

Faced with reduced membership and financial struggle, the final Sunday morning service at Gethsemane will occur in November 2019.

References

External links
 Gethsemane Episcopal Church website

Episcopal church buildings in Minnesota
National Register of Historic Places in Minneapolis
Churches in Minneapolis
Churches on the National Register of Historic Places in Minnesota
Gothic Revival church buildings in Minnesota
Stone churches in Minnesota